The 2018 World Rugby Under 20 Trophy was the eleventh annually held international rugby union competition for Under 20 national teams, with host nation Romania, along with seven other sides, playing in a group stage followed by a knockout round to determine a champion as well as promotion to the following years' World Rugby Under 20 Championship.

Qualified teams 
A total of eight teams played in the tournament. Other than the host nation of Romania and Samoa who were relegated following the 2017 World Rugby Under 20 Championship, six nations qualified through their respective regional qualifiers.

Host (1)
 
Relegated from 2017 JWC
 
Asia Rugby (1)
  
 Rugby Africa (1)
 

Sudamérica Rugby (1)
 
Rugby Americas North (1)
 
Rugby Europe (1)
 
Oceania Rugby (1)

Pool Stage

Pool A 
{| class="wikitable" style="text-align: center;"
|-
!width="200"|Team
!width="25"|Pld
!width="25"|W
!width="25"|D
!width="25"|L
!width="35"|PF
!width="35"|PA
!width="35"|PD
!width="25"|TF
!width="25"|TA
!width="25"|Pts
|-
| align="left" |
| 3||3||0||0||113||65||+48||18||9||15
|-
| align="left" |
| 3||2||0||1||167||77||+90||21||12||10
|-
| align="left" |
| 3||1||0||2||86||158||-72||12||24||5
|-
| align="left" |
| 3||0||0||3||76||142||-66||12||18||2
|}

Pool B 
{| class="wikitable" style="text-align: center;"
|-
!width="200"|Team
!width="25"|Pld
!width="25"|W
!width="25"|D
!width="25"|L
!width="35"|PF
!width="35"|PA
!width="35"|PD
!width="25"|TF
!width="25"|TA
!width="25"|Pts
|-
|align=left| 
| 3||3||0||0||140||82||+58||23||9||15
|-
| align="left" |
| 3||2||0||1||79||76||+3||9||9||9
|-
| align="left" |
| 3||1||0||2||76||104||-28||11||15||6
|-
| align="left" |
| 3||0||0||3|| 78||111||-33||6||16||2
|}

Finals 
 7th place

 5th place

 3rd place

 Final

References

External links
 Tournament Website
 World Rugby Website

2018
2018 rugby union tournaments for national teams
Rugby union
2018 in Romanian sport
International rugby union competitions hosted by Romania
Sports competitions in Bucharest
World Rugby Under 20 Trophy
World Rugby Under 20 Trophy